Elisha Mills Huntington (March 29, 1806 – October 26, 1862) was Commissioner of the United States General Land Office and a United States district judge of the United States District Court for the District of Indiana.

Early life
Huntington was born on March 27, 1806, in Butternuts, New York.  He was a son of Mary (née Corning) Huntington (1763–1852) and Nathaniel Huntington (1763–1815). Among his siblings was Nathaniel Huntington, a member of the Indiana House of Representatives from 1827 to 1828, and James Huntington, a member of New York State Senate from 1856 to 1857.

His paternal grandparents were Dinah (née Rudd) Huntington and Eliphalet Huntington, a brother of Samuel Huntington, the 7th President of the Continental Congress and 18th Governor of Connecticut.

Career
After receiving an education at Canandaigua, New York with his uncle Elisha Mills, at the age of fourteen he entered the law office of Mark H. Sibley (later a New York State Senator and a U.S. Representative) and read law. In 1822, he went to Indiana with his elder brother Nathaniel where he studied for four years before being admitted to the state bar.  He entered private practice in Cannelton, Indiana from 1827 to 1830.  In 1830, he was appointed the first prosecutor for the Seventh Judicial Circuit of Indiana, serving until 1832.

For the next four years, he was a member of the Indiana House of Representatives, serving from 1832 to 1836. He resumed private practice in Vigo County, Indiana from 1834 to 1837.  He was Presiding Judge of the Indiana Circuit Court for the Seventh Judicial Circuit from 1837 to 1841.  President John Tyler appointed him Commissioner of the United States General Land Office in Washington, D.C. from 1841 to 1842.

Federal judicial service
On April 26, 1842, Huntington was nominated by President Tyler to a seat on the United States District Court for the District of Indiana vacated by Judge Jesse Lynch Holman. He was confirmed by the United States Senate on May 2, 1842, and received his commission the same day.  He served until his death in October 1862.

Personal life
On November 3, 1841, Huntington was married to Susan Mary (née Rudd) FitzHugh (1820–1853).  Susan, a widow of Clark FitzHugh, was a daughter of Ann Benoist (née Palmer) Rudd (a relative of former Vice President John C. Calhoun) and Dr. Christopher Rudd (a relative of U.S. Senator Charles Carroll of Carrollton). Together, they were the parents of:

 Robert Palmer Huntington (1842–1893), who married Alice Ford (1844–1919), a daughter of James Coleman Ford and Mary Jane (née Trimble) Ford, in 1867.
 Mary St. Clair Huntington (1844–1845), who died young.
 Mary Louise Huntington (1846–1872), who married William Pritchard Coleman (1844–1924) in 1870.
 Gertrude Huntington (b. 1848)
 Christopher Rudd Huntington (1850–1875), who died unmarried.
 Hetty Key Huntington (1852–1852), who died in infancy.

His wife died on December 3, 1853.  After a pulmonary disease forced him to seek warmer climates to seek relief, Huntington traveled to Saint Paul, Minnesota and then Havana, Cuba before returning to St. Paul where he died on October 26, 1862. 	Per his wishes, his nephew John H. Rea of Indianapolis took his remains and he was buried at Saint Joseph Cemetery (he converted to Roman Catholicism, his wife's religion, late in his life) in Terre Haute, Indiana.

Descendants
Through his eldest son Robert, he was a grandfather of tennis player and architect Robert Palmer Huntington, who married Helen Gray Dinsmore and was the father of socialite, arts patron, and political hostess Helen Huntington Hull, the first wife of Vincent Astor of the Astor family.

See also
 Huntington family

References

External links
 
 
 Huntington, Elisha Mills (1806–1862) at The Political Graveyard

1806 births
1862 deaths
People from Cannelton, Indiana
People from Butternuts, New York
Indiana state court judges
Members of the Indiana House of Representatives
Judges of the United States District Court for the District of Indiana
United States federal judges appointed by John Tyler
19th-century American judges
General Land Office Commissioners
United States federal judges admitted to the practice of law by reading law
19th-century American politicians